John Carey Douglas (July 14, 1874 – December 10, 1926) was a Canadian politician.

Born in Stellarton, Nova Scotia, the son of John and Ann (Carey) Douglas, Douglas was educated in public schools, in Stellarton, at Pictou Academy and Mount Allison University where he received a Bachelor of Arts degree in 1897 and a Master of Arts in 1909. He received a Bachelor of Law degree from Dalhousie University in 1899 and was called to the Bar in 1900. In 1901, he started a legal practice in Glace Bay, Nova Scotia. From 1908 to 1911 he was mayor of Glace Bay. From 1911 to 1916, he was a Liberal-Conservative member of the Nova Scotia House of Assembly for Cape Breton County. He was elected to the House of Commons of Canada as the Unionist candidate for the electoral district of Cape Breton South and Richmond in the 1917 election. He was defeated in the 1921 election.

From 1925 to 1926, he was a member again of the Nova Scotia House of Assembly. He was also Minister of Lands and Forests and Attorney General in the cabinet of Edgar Nelson Rhodes. He was elected to the Canadian House of Commons as the Conservative candidate for the electoral district of Antigonish—Guysborough in the 1926 election. He died a short while later in December 1926.

References
 
 

1874 births
1926 deaths
Dalhousie University alumni
Conservative Party of Canada (1867–1942) MPs
Members of the House of Commons of Canada from Nova Scotia
Mount Allison University alumni
Progressive Conservative Association of Nova Scotia MLAs
People from Pictou County
Unionist Party (Canada) MPs